Vietnam competed at the 2020 Summer Paralympics in Tokyo, Japan, from 24 August to 5 September 2021.

Medalists

Competitors
The following is the list of number of competitors participating in the Games:

Athletics 

One Vietnamese javelin thrower, Cao Ngọc Hùng (F57) successfully to break through the qualifications for the 2020 Paralympics after breaking the qualification limit.

Field Events - Men

Field Events - Women

Powerlifting

Swimming 

Three Vietnamese swimmer has successfully entered the paralympic slot after breaking the MQS.

 Men

 Women

See also
Vietnam at the Paralympics
Vietnam at the 2020 Summer Olympics

References 

Nations at the 2020 Summer Paralympics
2020
2021 in Vietnamese sport